Connie in the Country is the seventh studio album by American country singer Connie Smith. It was released in February 1967 via the RCA Camden label and contained ten of tracks of material. It was her first to be released on RCA's budget Camden label. Unlike other RCA Camden albums, the project consisted of new recordings for Smith's catalog. This included the single, "Cry, Cry, Cry", which was a top 20 hit on the American country songs chart in 1968.

Background and content
Connie Smith had first signed with the RCA label in 1964 and released her first single the same year. That single, "Once a Day", reached number one on the country chart for eight weeks and brought forth a series of top ten singles during the decade. Smith had released six studio albums with RCA Victor between 1965 and 1967. Connie in the Country would be her first studio recording with RCA Camden, a budget subdivision of RCA Victor. Prior to Smith, only country artist Jim Reeves had recorded a studio album with RCA Camden. Smith's RCA Camden project would be a traditionally-influenced country album. According to biographer Colin Escott, "The underlying assumption seemed to be that people who liked hardcore country music wouldn't or couldn't pay full-price." 

Smith entered the studio to record the album's tracks between August 22 and August 23 of 1966.  The sessions were held at RCA Studio B, located in Nashville, Tennessee. The project was produced by Bob Ferguson and Ethel Gabriel. It was Smith's first recording sessions with Gabriel (she had previously worked alongside Bob Ferguson). A total of ten tracks comprised the album. The album's opening track was a new recording titled "Cry, Cry, Cry". The remaining nine tracks were covers of country music songs. Among these covers were two covers by Loretta Lynn: "You Ain't Woman Enough (To Take My Man)" and "World of Forgotten People". It also featured two songs originally made popular by Buck Owens: "Foolin' Around" and "Love's Gonna Live Here".

Release and reception
Connie in the Country was released in February 1967 on the RCA Camden label. It was the seventh studio album released in Smith's career and first album with RCA Camden. The disc was originally distributed as a vinyl LP, containing five songs on either side of the record. Decades later, the album was re-issued to digital and streaming markets, which included Apple Music. Although the album did not receive a review from AllMusic, its lead track ("Cry, Cry, Cry"), was named an "album pick". "Cry, Cry, Cry" was the only single spawned from the project and was released in September 1968. The single became the first in Smith's career to chart outside the top ten, peaking at number 20 in November 1968.

Track listings

Vinyl version

Digital version

Personnel
All credits are adapted from the liner notes of Connie in the Country and the biography booklet by Colin Escott titled Born to Sing.

Musical personnel
 Anita Carter – background vocals
 Dorothy Dillard – background vocals
 Dolores Edgin – background vocals
 Buddy Harman – drums
 Walter Haynes – bass guitar, guitar
 Priscilla Hubbard – background vocals
 Ron Huskey – bass
 Charles Justice – fiddle
 Leonard Miller – drums
 Weldon Myrick – steel guitar
 Louis Nunley – background vocals
 Dean Porter – guitar
 Hargus "Pig" Robbins – piano
 Connie Smith – lead vocals
 Velma Smith – guitar
 William Wright – background vocals

Technical personnel
 Bob Ferguson – Producer
 Ethel Gabriel – Producer
 Al Pachucki – Engineer
 Chuck Seitz – Engineer
 Bill Walker – Contractor

Release history

References

Footnotes

Books

 

1967 albums
Connie Smith albums
Albums produced by Bob Ferguson (music)
RCA Camden albums